Bo Magnus Sköldmark (born September 22, 1968 in Långsele) is a Swedish former footballer who is currently club director for Swedish side Örebro SK. Sköldmark played for Örebro SK in his native Sweden before spells with Chinese side Dalian Wanda and Scottish side Dundee United. During his spell at Dundee United he is remembered for scoring in a 2-1 league win over rivals Dundee. He scored one other goal for United in the Scottish Cup against Ayr United to send them into the semi finals. Sköldmark returned to Sweden in 2000 and finished his career with GAIS before he got the role of club director in Gais. Between 2016 and 2019 Sköldmark was working as club director for his former club Örebro SK Since 2020 he is the club director of GAIS.

Honours
 Scottish League Cup: Runner-up
 1997-98

See also
 Dundee United F.C. season 1997-98
 Dundee United F.C. season 1998-99
 Dundee United F.C. season 1999-00

References

External links
 

1968 births
Living people
Swedish footballers
Swedish expatriate footballers
GAIS players
Swedish expatriate sportspeople in Scotland
Örebro SK players
Dalian Shide F.C. players
Dundee United F.C. players
Scottish Premier League players
Expatriate footballers in China
Expatriate footballers in Scotland
Swedish expatriate sportspeople in China
Scottish Football League players
Association football defenders
Swedish expatriate sportspeople in the United Kingdom